Aaron Alward (May 21, 1828 – April 13, 1886) was a physician and political figure in New Brunswick, Canada. He represented the City of Saint John in the Legislative Assembly of New Brunswick from 1870 to 1874.

He was born in Salisbury, New Brunswick, a descendant of United Empire Loyalists, and educated in Saint Stephen. He graduated in medicine at New York City and set up practice in Saint John. In 1860, Alward married Hattie Newel Smith. He served on the Saint John City Council and was mayor from 1866 to 1870. He was an unsuccessful candidate for a seat in the provincial assembly in 1882. He died in Saint John four years later.

References 
The Canadian parliamentary companion HJ Morgan (1874)
New Brunswick political biographies, Irish Canadian Cultural Association of New Brunswick

1828 births
1886 deaths
Members of the Legislative Assembly of New Brunswick
Mayors of Saint John, New Brunswick
Colony of New Brunswick people